Thomas Restout (15 March 1671 – 2 May 1754, in Caen) was a French painter. The son of Marc Restout, he belonged to the Restout dynasty of painters and was mainly a portraitist.

References
 Édouard Frère, Manuel du bibliographe normand, Rouen, Le Brument, 1860
 Philippe de Chennevières, Recherches sur la vie et les ouvrages de quelques peintres provinciaux de l'ancienne France, Paris, Dumoulin, 1847–1862

1671 births
1754 deaths
17th-century French painters
French male painters
18th-century French painters
18th-century French male artists